Vassilis Goumas (alternate spellings: Vasilis, Vasillos, Gkoumas) (Greek: Βασίλης Γκούμας; born 15 November 1946) is a retired Greek professional basketball player. During his playing career, he was nicknamed "The Emperor".

Early career
Goumas began playing basketball in Greece, with the youth clubs of Olympiacos Volos. He later spent a year in South Africa, followed by two years in Ethiopia, where he played basketball with Olympiacos EAS Addis Ababa.

Professional career
Goumas began his pro career in 1966, with the Greek team Panellinios, where he was the long-time star of the club. He was the first player to ever reach 10,000 career points scored in the top-tier level Greek Basketball Championship. He is also the unofficial second all-time top scorer in the history of the Greek League (including games before the league split into two divisions, since the 1963–64 season), with 11,030 career points scored. He is second only on the combined career scoring list to the legendary Nikos Galis (12,714 points).

In his career, Goumas took part in 412 games in the Greek League, while playing with Panellinios, AEK Athens, and Ilysiakos. His career scoring average in the Greek League was 26.8 points per game. He was the Greek League Top Scorer 4 times during his career, in the years 1970, 1974, 1975, and 1977.

He was a member of the FIBA European Selection team in the year 1974.  He was the Greek Cup Finals Top Scorer in 1981.

National team career
Goumas played with the junior national teams of Greece in 4 games. He also played with the senior men's Greek national basketball team in 114 games, in which he scored a total of 1,641 points, for an average of 14.4 points per game. His personal best scoring game with Greece's senior national team was 41 points, which he scored against the German national basketball team in 1971.

With Greece, he played at the 1967 EuroBasket, the 1969 EuroBasket, the 1972 Pre-Olympic Tournament, the 1973 EuroBasket, and the 1975 EuroBasket.

Awards and accomplishments
4× Greek League Top Scorer: (1970, 1974, 1975, 1977)
FIBA European Selection: (1974)
Greek Cup Winner: (1981)
Greek Cup Finals Top Scorer: (1981)
2nd all-time leading scorer of the Greek Basketball Championship, with 11,030 total points scored in the Greek A National League (1963–64 season to present).

References

External links
FIBA Profile (archive)
FIBA Europe Profile
Hellenic Basketball Federation Profile 
Τα “κανόνια” του ελληνικού Πρωταθλήματος: Βασίλης Γκούμας 

1946 births
Living people
AEK B.C. players
Centers (basketball)
Greek Basket League players
Greek men's basketball players
Ilysiakos B.C. players
Panellinios B.C. players
Power forwards (basketball)
Basketball players from Volos